The 1964 Gent–Wevelgem was the 26th edition of the Gent–Wevelgem cycle race and was held on 21 March 1964. The race started in Ghent and finished in Wevelgem. The race was won by Jacques Anquetil of the Saint-Raphaël team.

General classification

References

Gent–Wevelgem
1964 in road cycling
1964 in Belgian sport
March 1964 sports events in Europe